Declan McAleer (born 10 July 1973) is an Irish Sinn Féin politician who was selected by his party as a member (MLA) of the Northern Ireland Assembly to represent the West Tyrone constituency in June 2012.

He replaced his party colleague Pat Doherty, an abstentionist MP in the parliament of the United Kingdom, who had resigned from the Northern Ireland Assembly as part of Sinn Féin's policy of abolishing double jobbing. He previously served on a local council.

References

1973 births
Living people
Sinn Féin MLAs
Northern Ireland MLAs 2011–2016
Northern Ireland MLAs 2016–2017
Northern Ireland MLAs 2017–2022
Place of birth missing (living people)
Northern Ireland MLAs 2022–2027